Vanzo is a surname. Notable people with the surname include:

Alain Vanzo (1928–2002), French opera singer and composer
Dorino Vanzo (born 1950), Italian racing cyclist
Fred Vanzo (1916–1976), American football player
Gregg Vanzo (born 1961), American animator
Julio Vanzo (1901–1984), Argentine artist